The tautirut (Inuktitut syllabics:  or tautiruut, also known as the Eskimo fiddle) is a bowed zither native to the Inuit culture of  Canada.

Lucien M. Turner described the "Eskimo violin" in 1894 as being

The Canadian anthropologist Ernest William Hawkes described the tautirut in 1916:

Origin
The tautirut, along with the Apache fiddle are among the few First Nations chordophones which may possibly be pre-Columbian in origin.  Ethnomusicologist Anthony Baines and others have noted the similarity of the tautirut to the Icelandic fiðla and Shetland gue.

Peter Cooke believed that the tautirut'''s limited distribution around the Hudson Bay area indicated that it was introduced to the Inuit by Hudson's Bay Company sailors from the Orkney and Shetland Islands.<ref>Peter Cooke. The fiddle tradition of the Shetland Isles. CUP Archive, 1986. , 978-0-521-26855-4. p.  5.</ref>

External links
Tautirut in the collection of the  Faculté de musique, Université de Montréal

Further reading
 Hawe's Eskimo Music, in: Scientific American: Supplement, Munn and Co., 1917, p. 187f.
 E. Y. Arima and M. Einarsson, Whence and Where the Eskimo Fiddle?', Folk'', vol 18, 1976 
 The academics Maija Lutz and Susan Kaplan have been noted as having studied the Eskimo fiddle.

References

Bowed box zithers
Inuit musical instruments
Bowed lyres
Canadian musical instruments